St George West is a district (Ward) of Bristol. It became a single-councillor ward for the May 2016 council election following a review of boundaries in the city after years of population growth.
It comprises western parts of the old ward that shares its name. It covers St George Park, the upper end of Church Road (from the junction at Avonvale Road to just beyond the Fountain), Plummers Hill and parts of Crofts End to the north, down to the River Avon to the south, and includes part of Redfield in the south-west. 

It’s councillor is Asher Craig (Labour) who is also Bristol’s Deputy Mayor with responsibility for Communities, Equalities and Public Health.

St George West is located in the outer east of the city of Bristol,. in the parliamentary ward that is served by Kerry McCarthy MP (Labour).

Schools

There are five schools in the ward.  This includes Air Balloon Hill Infant and Junior Schools, Air Balloon Hill Junior School, Speedwell Nursery School, St. Patrick's Catholic Primary School and Summerhill School.

Air Balloon Hill School can be found on Hillside Road. Speedwell Nursery School can be found on Speedwell Road and St. Patrick's Catholic Primary School is located on Blackswarth Road.

Local elections
The most recent local election for St George West was held on 5 May 2016 and was won by Labour candidate Asher Craig.

The 1995 local election in St. George West was won by Ronald Edward Stone	 and John Edward Deasy, who were the Labour party candidates. In 1997, there was a 68.21% turnout for an election which was won by the Labour party. The Labour party has continued to win the local election in the ward, although in 2007 they achieved only 38.24% of the vote. This was less than 2% more than the Conservative Party candidate, who was in second place. In the 2008 by-election, after the death of the Labour
candidate the Conservative party attracted some controversy after replacing their previous candidate, Angelo Agathangelou, with Colin Bretherton.

Age

Of the 10,928 people in the ward, approximately 146 are under the age of one. The majority of the resident are of working age, although 401 are aged between 75 and 79. No people in the ward are aged over 100.

References

Areas of Bristol
Wards of Bristol